The Society for Historians of American Foreign Relations (SHAFR) was founded in order to "promote excellence in research and teaching of American foreign relations history and to facilitate professional collaboration among scholars and students in this field around the world." It is the preeminent organization in its field, with nearly 1,300 current members in over forty countries. It hosts an annual conference, and publishes the quarterly Diplomatic History. It also publishes a triennial newsletter, Passport. SHAFR has increasingly fostered connections with international institutions and organizations.

SHAFR was founded in April 1967, as a result of the efforts of Joseph O'Grady, Betty Miller Unterbeger, Armin Rappaport, and David Trask. The first meeting took place during the meeting of the Organization of American Historians in Chicago, Illinois, and was attended by around 75 scholars in the field. Its first stand-alone national conference was held at Georgetown University in 1975. A volume that included some of the papers presented at that conference included an all-male cast of authors and papers focused on male foreign-policy actors such as George F. Kennan, Charles E. Bohlen, and James G. Blaine.

Founded in the midst of tremendous social and political change, the Society sought to support new understandings of the U.S. role in the world, and to attract attention to the study of foreign relations of other countries. Finding an audience interested in such an approach, the Society grew. In 1976, it announced that, after a debate lasting since the beginning of SHAFR, the organization would publish a journal; this journal would be Diplomatic History, the first issue of which was published in January 1978.

The journal is “devoted to U.S. international history and foreign relations, broadly defined, including grand strategy, diplomacy, and issues involving gender, culture, ethnicity, and ideology.” The journal is currently edited by Nick Cullather (Indiana University) and Anne Foster (Indiana State University).

Additionally, SHAFR publishes Passport, the newsletter of the Society. Passport publishes reviews, round-tables, pedagogical studies, reports on archives, and other matters of interests to historians of foreign relations. It is released every January, April, and September.

SHAFR also funds fellowships, grants, and financial awards to aid in research projects and to recognize excellence in the field. They include the Stuart L. Bernath book prize, awarded every year to the best first book written by a scholar in the field; the annual Robert H. Ferrell Book Prize for distinguished scholarship in the field; the Myrna F. Bernath Book Award for the best book in the field by a woman; the Norman and Laura Graebner Award, which recognizes distinguished lifetime achievement by a senior historian of United States foreign relations, and the Marilyn Blatt Young Dissertation Fellowship for one of the most promising doctoral candidates in the final phase of completing their dissertations.

SHAFR annually hosts an academic conference in June. Every other year, the conference is held in the Washington, D.C. area; in even-numbered years locations vary, and have recently included San Diego, Lexington, KY, and Hartford, CT. In addition to a variety of discussion panels, the conference features addresses by experts in foreign relations, including those outside of academia. Recent speakers have included Rajiv Chandrasekaran and, controversially, General David Petraeus.

Besides its own official activities, SHAFR cooperates with other academic and public history organizations. For example, SHAFR is a member of the National Coalition for History and has representatives on the Historical Advisory Committee of the U.S. Department of State's Office of the Historian. Notably, SHAFR also hosts events every year at the meeting of the American Historical Association.

In 1986, Betty Miller Unterberger of Texas A&M University became the first woman president of the organization, then 99 percent male in membership. Since then, the organization has had four more women presidents: Emily Rosenberg (Macalester College, 1997), Marilyn B. Young (New York University, 2011), Mary L. Dudziak (Emory University, 2017), and Barbara Keys (University of Melbourne, 2019). Keys was the first president in the organization's history to be based at a university outside the United States. Cambridge University historian Andrew Preston was elected vice president/president-elect in 2019; in 2021 he will become the first SHAFR president not to hold U.S. citizenship.

References

External links
 
  “U.S. Diplomatic History Resources Index", sponsored by the Society for Historians of American Foreign Relations (SHAFR).

Organizations established in 1967
Foreign relations of the United States
Learned societies of the United States
Historical societies of the United States
Professional associations based in the United States
History organizations based in the United States
Historians of American foreign relations